Viktor Borisovich Kidyayev (born July 9, 1956,  Zhukovka, Mordovian Autonomous Soviet Socialist Republic) is a Russian political figure and deputy of the 5th, 6th, 7th, and 8th State Dumas.  

In 1986, he headed the knitting factory in Zubova Polyana. From 1987 to 1996, he was the chairman of the district consumer union. Kidyaev was elected member of the district council of deputies and deputy of the State Assembly of the Republic of Mordovia. In 1996, he was elected head of the Zubovo-Polyansky District and remained in that position for more than 12 years. Since 2007, he has been a member of the United Russia party. In 2009, he received Oleg Korgunov's mandate in the 5th State Duma from the Tambov Oblast constituency. In 2011, 2016, and 2021 he was re-elected as deputy of the 6th, 7th, and 8th State Dumas respectively.

In 2015, Viktor Kidayev was suspended from supervising the United Russia election campaign in the Kaluga Oblast following reports of intimidation of members of the region's election commission.

He is one of the members of the State Duma the United States Treasury sanctioned on 24 March 2022 in response to the 2022 Russian invasion of Ukraine.

Awards 

 Order of Friendship
 Order of Glory

References

1956 births
Living people
People from Mordovia
United Russia politicians
21st-century Russian politicians
Eighth convocation members of the State Duma (Russian Federation)
Seventh convocation members of the State Duma (Russian Federation)
Sixth convocation members of the State Duma (Russian Federation)
Fifth convocation members of the State Duma (Russian Federation)
Russian individuals subject to the U.S. Department of the Treasury sanctions